Cabo San Lucas International Airport  is a small international airfield (officially an "aerodrome") located  northwest of Cabo San Lucas in Baja California Sur, Mexico.

The airport has air taxi service. Recently, the runway was enlarged and lengthened to 7,000 ft. Also, new navigation aids were installed, along with new air traffic control equipment, control tower, lighting, PAPI visual aids, and a new FBO with all the ground support equipment.

It handled 45,178 passengers in 2021.

Airlines and destinations

See also
 SJD - Los Cabos International Airport

References

External links
 Cabo San Lucas Airport, official website
 Cabo San Lucas Airport, Reference website
 Avanza ampliación del aeropuerto de CSL 

Airports in Baja California Sur
Los Cabos Municipality (Baja California Sur)